The following American politicians are affiliated with the Tea Party movement, which is generally considered to be conservative, libertarian-leaning, and populist. The Tea Party movement is a political movement that advocates reducing the U.S. national debt and federal budget deficit by reducing U.S. government spending and taxes. It is not a single, formal political party, but is represented by activist groups such as the Tea Party Patriots and the Tea Party Express. However, research has shown that members of the Tea Party Caucus vote like a third party in Congress. The Tea Party Caucus was the primary vehicle for the movement in Congress. The Liberty Caucus and Freedom Caucus are closely associated with the Tea Party movement.

Alabama
 Robert Aderholt, Republican U.S. representative  from Alabama's 4th congressional district (1997–present) and a member of the Tea Party Caucus.
 Mo Brooks, Republican U.S. representative  from Alabama's 5th congressional district (2011–present) and a member of the Freedom Caucus., which is ideologically aligned with the Tea Party movement.
 Bradley Byrne, Republican U.S. representative  from Alabama's 1st congressional district (2014–2021). In December 2013, he won a special election to represent Alabama's 1st congressional district in the U.S. House of Representatives.  He is a member of the House Freedom Caucus.   The caucus is sympathetic to the Tea Party movement. The Freedom Caucus is considered the farthest-right grouping within the House Republican Conference.
 Martha Roby, Republican U.S. representative  from Alabama's 2nd congressional district (2011–2021) and a member of the Tea Party Caucus.

Alaska

Sarah Palin, former Republican Governor of Alaska (2006–2009), nominee for Vice President of the United States in the 2008 election, and prominent speaker and leader of the Tea Party.

Arizona
 
 Joe Arpaio, former Maricopa County Sheriff (1993-2017)
 Kelly Townsend, former Republican member of the Arizona Senate from the 16th district (2013–2021). A member of the Republican Party and veteran, Townsend was the founder of Greater Phoenix Tea Party Patriots, with 18 subgroups around the greater Phoenix area.
 Debbie Lesko, Republican U.S. representative from Arizona's 8th congressional district (2018–present) and a member of the Tea Party.
 Martha McSally (born March 22, 1966) is an American politician serving as the U.S. representative for Arizona's 2nd congressional district from 2015 to 2018, and U.S. Senator from Arizona from 2019 to 2020. A member of the Republican Party and retired military officer, she served in the United States Air Force from 1988 to 2010, rising to the rank of colonel. McSally was one of the highest ranking female pilots in the history of the air force. She was the first American woman to fly in combat following the 1991 lifting of the prohibition on female combat pilots.
 David Schweikert He currently represents Arizona's 6th congressional district, which includes most of northern Phoenix as well as Scottsdale, Paradise Valley, and Cave Creek. He is a member of the Freedom Caucus  and the Congressional Western Caucus.
 Jeff Flake, U.S. representative from Arizona's 1st congressional district (2001–2013), Senator of Arizona from 2013-2019.

Arkansas
Rick Crawford U.S. representative  for Arkansas's 1st congressional district since 2011 until present. He is a member of the Tea Party Patriots 
 French Hill is the U.S. representative  for Arkansas's 2nd congressional district. He was elected in the 2014 election and took office on January 3, 2015. He is a member of Tea Party Patriots
 Steve Womack is an American politician who has been the Arkansas's 3rd congressional district since 2011.  Prior to his election to Congress, Womack was Mayor of Rogers, Arkansas. He is a Republican politician and he is a member of  Tea Party Patriots
 Bruce Westerman is a Republican U.S. representative  for Arkansas's 4th congressional district. Previously, he served as the Majority Leader of the Arkansas House of Representatives. Westerman is a member of Tea Party Patriots In 2014, Westerman ran successfully for the U.S. House to succeed Tom Cotton, who had unseated Democratic U.S. Senator Mark Pryor.

California
 Jeff Denham (born July 29, 1967) is an American politician, United States Air Force veteran, and businessman. A member of the Republican Party, he is a former U.S. representative  for California's 10th congressional district. Denham first won election to the U.S. House in 2010, representing California's 19th congressional district for one term before redistricting led him to run in the 10th district in 2012.
 Steve Knight (politician) (born December 17, 1966) is an American politician of the Republican Party who served as the U.S. representative  California's 25th congressional district from 2015 to 2019. Previously, he represented California's 21st State Senate district from 2012 to 2015 and California's 36th State Assembly district from 2008 through 2012. From 2010 to 2012, he served as Assistant Minority Leader in the California State Assembly. Knight served in the U.S. Army from 1985 to 1993 and served for 18 years with the Los Angeles Police Department. He was previously a member of the Palmdale, California City Council. Mr. Knight is a member of Tea Party Patriots
 Doug LaMalfa has represented California's 1st congressional district, located in Northern California, since 2013. Endorsed by Carol Byers, Lassen Tea Party Organizer in 2018.  article from November 19, 2012 "Tea Party Patriots welcomes new Members to Congress"
 Tom McClintock, Republican U.S. representative  from California's 4th congressional district (2009–present) and a member of the Tea Party Caucus.
 Gary Miller, Republican U.S. representative  from California's 41st (1999–2003) and 42nd (2003–present) congressional districts and a member of the Tea Party Caucus. In February 2014, Miller announced he would step down at the next election.
 Ed Royce, Republican U.S. representative  from California's 39th (1993–2003 and 2013–2019) and 40th (2003–2013) congressional districts and a member of the Tea Party Caucus.  On January 8, 2018, Royce announced that he will retire from Congress at the end of his current term and not run for reelection in 2018 
 David Valadao (born April 14, 1977) represented California's 21st congressional district from 2013 to 2019. Prior to that, he served one term in the California State Assembly, representing the 30th district. In Congress, Valadao has gained a reputation as one of the Republican Party's leading advocates of comprehensive immigration reform. He is a member of  Tea Party Patriots

Colorado
 Mike Coffman, Republican U.S. representative  from Colorado's 6th congressional district (2009-2019) and a member of the Tea Party Caucus. Coffman's 2012 re-election campaign has received the endorsement of FreedomWorks.
 Doug Lamborn, Republican U.S. representative  from Colorado's 5th congressional district (2007–present) and a member of the Tea Party Caucus.
 John Suthers, Republican Mayor of Colorado Springs, Colorado  (2015–present) and a member of the Tea Party Caucus.
 Ken Buck, Republican U.S. representative  from Colorado's 4th congressional district (2015–present)

Florida
 Sandy Adams, Republican U.S. representative  from Florida's 24th congressional district (2011–2013) and a member of the Tea Party Caucus. Adams' 2012 re-election campaign has received the endorsement of the Central Florida Tea Party.
 Gus Bilirakis, Republican U.S. representative  from Florida's 9th congressional district (2007–present) and a member of the Tea Party Caucus.
 Curt Clawson, Republican U.S. representative  from Florida's 19th congressional district (2014–2017). Clawson delivered the Tea Party response to President Obama's State of the Union Address in 2015.
 Ander Crenshaw, Republican U.S. representative  from Florida's 4th congressional district (2001–2017) and a member of the Tea Party Caucus.
 Matt Gaetz U.S. representative  from Florida's 1st congressional district (2017–present) where he serves on the Budget, Armed Services, and Judiciary Committees.  Gaetz has an A+ rating from the NRA—its highest rating. He is a member of the Tea Party.
 Rich Nugent, Republican U.S. representative  from Florida's 5th congressional district (2011–2017) and a member of the Tea Party Caucus.
 Dennis Ross, Republican U.S. representative  from Florida's 12th congressional district (2011–2019) and a member of the Tea Party Caucus.
 Cliff Stearns, Republican U.S. representative  from Florida's 6th congressional district (1989–2013) and a member of the Tea Party Caucus.
 Allen West, former Republican U.S. representative  from Florida's 22nd congressional district (2011–2013) and a member of the Tea Party Caucus during his time in Congress. West's 2012 re-election campaign has received the endorsement of FreedomWorks. He lost his re-election bid in 2012 to Patrick Murphy.
Dan Webster, U.S. representative  from Florida's 11th congressional district (2011–present)
Ted Yoho, U.S. representative  from Florida's 3rd congressional district (2013–2021)

Georgia
 Paul Broun, Republican U.S. representative  from Georgia's 10th congressional district (2007–2015) and a member of the Tea Party Caucus. Broun was re-elected in November 2012.
 Herman Cain, 2012 presidential candidate. Cain gave the Tea Party response to President Barack Obama's 2012 State of the Union Address.
 Phil Gingrey, Republican U.S. representative  from Georgia's 11th congressional district (2003–2015) and a member of the Tea Party Caucus.
 Tom Price, Republican U.S. representative  from Georgia's 6th congressional district (2005–2017), U.S. Secretary of Health and Human Services, and a member of the Tea Party Caucus.
 Lynn Westmoreland, Republican U.S. representative  from Georgia's 8th (2005–07) and 3rd (2007–2017) congressional districts and a member of the Tea Party Caucus.

Illinois
 Joe Walsh, Republican U.S. representative  from Illinois's 8th congressional district (2011–2013) and a member of the Tea Party Caucus. Walsh's 2012 re-election campaign has received the endorsement of FreedomWorks. Walsh has since been defeated by Tammy Duckworth.
 Adam Kinzinger, Republican U.S. representative  from Illinois's 16th congressional district (2011–present)

Indiana
 Dan Burton, Republican U.S. representative  from Indiana's 6th (1983–2003) and 5th (2003–present) congressional districts and a member of the Tea Party Caucus.
 Mike Pence, 48th vice president of the United States (2017–2021), Republican governor of Indiana (2013–2017), U.S. representative  from Indiana's 2nd (2001–2003) and 6th (2003–2013) congressional districts and a member of the Tea Party Caucus.

Iowa
 Steve King, Republican State Senator (1997–2003), U.S. representative  from Iowa's 5th congressional district (2003–2013), from the 4th (2013–2021), and a founding member of the Tea Party Caucus. King's 2012 re-election campaign has received the endorsement of FreedomWorks. King was re-elected in November 2012.

Kansas
 Tim Huelskamp, Republican U.S. representative  from Kansas's 1st congressional district (2011–2017) and a member of the Tea Party Caucus.
 Lynn Jenkins, Republican U.S. representative  from Kansas's 2nd congressional district (2009–2019) and a member of the Tea Party Caucus.
 Jerry Moran, Republican U.S. Senator (2011–present) and a member of the Senate Tea Party Caucus.

Kentucky
 Rand Paul, Republican U.S. Senator (2011–present) and an inaugural member of the Senate Tea Party Caucus. Paul gave the tea party response to President Barack Obama's 2013 State of the Union Address.
 Thomas Massie, Republican U.S. representative  from the Kentucky's 4th congressional district (2012–present). In his 2012 election, Massie was endorsed by FreedomWorks.
 Matt Bevin, Republican Governor of Kentucky (2015–2019) and unsuccessful Republican candidate in the United States Senate election in Kentucky, 2014.
 Jenean Hampton, Republican Lieutenant Governor of Kentucky (2015-2019), 2014 state house candidate, and former chairwoman of the Bowling Green/Southern Kentucky Tea Party.

Louisiana
 Rodney Alexander, Republican U.S. representative  from Louisiana's 5th congressional district (2003–2013) and a member of the Tea Party Caucus, former Democrat.
 Bill Cassidy, Republican U.S. Senator from Louisiana (2015–present), and former Representative from Louisiana's 6th congressional district (2009–2015) and a member of the Tea Party Caucus.
 John Fleming, Republican U.S. representative  from Louisiana's 4th congressional district (2009–2017) and a member of the Tea Party Caucus.
 Jeff Landry, Republican U.S. representative  from Louisiana's 3rd congressional district (2011–2013) and a member of the Tea Party Caucus.
 Steve Scalise, Republican U.S. representative  from Louisiana's 1st congressional district (2008–present) and a member of the Tea Party Caucus.
 David Vitter, Republican U.S. Senator (2005–2017).

Maryland
 Roscoe Bartlett, Republican U.S. representative  from Maryland's 6th congressional district (1993–2013) and was a member of the Tea Party Caucus.

Michigan
 Justin Amash, Libertarian U.S. representative  from Michigan's 3rd congressional district (2011–2021). In May 2012, Susan Davis of USA Today described Amash as "Tea Party-aligned".
 Todd Courser, State Representative
 Cindy Gamrat, former state representative
 Pete Hoekstra, Republican U.S. representative  from Michigan's 2nd congressional district (1993–2011) and a member of the Tea Party Caucus.
 Tim Walberg, Republican U.S. representative  from Michigan's 7th congressional district (2007–09, 2011–present) and a member of the Tea Party Caucus.

Minnesota

 Michele Bachmann, Republican U.S. representative  from Minnesota's 6th congressional district (2007–2015) and founder of the Tea Party Caucus.

Mississippi
 Steven Palazzo, Republican U.S. representative  from Mississippi's 4th congressional district (2011–2023) and a member of the Tea Party Caucus. In September 2011, George Altman of gulflive.com described Palazzo as 2010's tea party darling".
 Chris McDaniel, Republican State Senator (2008–present).

Missouri
 Vicky Hartzler, Republican U.S. representative  from Missouri's 4th congressional district (2011–present) and a member of the Tea Party Caucus.
 Blaine Luetkemeyer, Republican U.S. representative  from Missouri's 9th congressional district (2009–present) and a member of the Tea Party Caucus.

Montana
 Denny Rehberg, former Republican U.S. representative  from Montana's At-large congressional district (2001–2013) and a member of the Tea Party Caucus.
 Derek Skees, Republican state representative (2011–2013). In October 2010, Skees said he "was in the Tea Party before it was cool".

Nebraska
 Adrian Smith, Republican, member of the Nebraska Legislature (1999–2007), U.S. representative  from Nebraska's 3rd congressional district (2007–present) and a member of the Tea Party Caucus.

North Carolina
 Howard Coble, Republican U.S. representative  from North Carolina's 6th congressional district (1985–2015) and a member of the Tea Party Caucus.
 Sue Myrick, Republican U.S. representative  from North Carolina's 9th congressional district (1995–2013) and a member of the Tea Party Caucus.

North Dakota
 Gary Emineth, former chair of the North Dakota Republican Party and a founding member of the North Dakota Tea Party Caucus.
 Duane Sand, Republican candidate for the U.S. Senate in 2000 and 2012 and for the U.S. House of Representatives in 2004 and 2008. Sand was a founding member of the North Dakota Tea Party Caucus.

South Carolina
 Jim DeMint, Republican U.S. Senator (2005–2013) and the founder of the Senate's Tea Party Caucus. In January 2012, Jim Davenport of The Huffington Post described DeMint as "a dean of the influential and well-funded tea party movement".
 Jeff Duncan, Republican U.S. representative  from South Carolina's 3rd congressional district (2011–present) and a member of the Tea Party Caucus.
 Mick Mulvaney, Republican U.S. representative  from South Carolina's 5th congressional district (2011–2017) and a member of the Tea Party Caucus. Mulvaney successfully challenged Democratic incumbent John Spratt in 2010, receiving the backing of the tea party.
 Mark Sanford, Republican governor of South Carolina (2003–11) and U.S. representative  from South Carolina's 1st congressional district (2013–2019). Sanford has described himself as "Tea Party before the Tea Party was cool".
 Tim Scott, Republican U.S. representative  from South Carolina's 1st congressional district (2011–2012), U.S. Senator from South Carolina (2012–present) and a member of the Tea Party Caucus.
 Joe Wilson, Republican U.S. representative  from South Carolina's 2nd congressional district (2001–present) and a member of the Tea Party Caucus. In November 2009 Wilson spoke at tea party events at Ford Mansion in Morristown, New Jersey and at Capitol Hill.

South Dakota
 Gordon Howie, Republican member of the South Dakota House of Representatives (2005–2009) and South Dakota Senate (2009–2011).

Tennessee
 Diane Black, Republican U.S. representative  from Tennessee's 6th congressional district (2011–2019) and a member of the Tea Party Caucus.
 Marsha Blackburn, Republican U.S. Senator (2019–present).
 Joe Carr, Republican State Representative (2009–2015). Carr was endorsed by Tea Party Nation, among other Tea Party endorsements, in his unsuccessful campaign for U.S. Senate in 2014.
 Stephen Fincher, Republican U.S. representative  from Tennessee's 8th congressional district (2011–2017) and a member of the Tea Party Caucus.
 Phil Roe, Republican U.S. representative  from Tennessee's 1st congressional district (2009–2021) and a member of the Tea Party Caucus.

Texas

 Michael Burgess, Republican U.S. representative  from Texas's 26th congressional district (2003–present) and a member of the Tea Party Caucus.
 John Carter, Republican U.S. representative  from Texas's 31st congressional district (2003–present), the secretary of the House Republican Conference and a member of the Tea Party Caucus.
 John Culberson, Republican U.S. representative  from Texas's 7th congressional district (2001–2019) and a member of the Tea Party Caucus.
 Ted Cruz, Republican U.S. Senator (2013–present). Michelle Cottle of The Daily Beast called Cruz "the delight of the Tea Party anti-establishment conservatives"
 David Dewhurst, Republican Lieutenant Governor of Texas (2003–2015). In April 2012 Gary Scharrer of the Houston Chronicle wrote that Dewhurst "emphasizes that he embraced the core principles of the Tea Party, before that movement gained momentum".
 Blake Farenthold, Republican U.S. representative  from Texas's 27th congressional district (2011–2018) and a member of the Tea Party Caucus.
 Louie Gohmert, Republican U.S. representative  from Texas's 1st congressional district (2005–present) and a member of the Tea Party Caucus.
 Ralph Hall, Republican U.S. representative  from Texas's 4th congressional district (1981–2015) and a member of the Tea Party Caucus.
 Jim Landtroop, Republican former member of the Texas House of Representatives from District 85; former resident of Plainview now residing in Lubbock
 Kenny Marchant, Republican U.S. representative  from Texas's 24th congressional district (2005–present) and a member of the Tea Party Caucus.
 Randy Neugebauer, Republican U.S. representative  from Texas's 19th congressional district (2003–2017) and a member of the Tea Party Caucus.
 Dan Patrick, Republican State Senator (2007–2015) and Lieutenant Governor of Texas (2015–present). As state senator, Patrick created a Tea Party Caucus in the Texas state legislature in late 2010.
 Ron Paul, Republican U.S. representative  from Texas's 22nd (1976–77, 1979–85) and 14th (1997–2013) congressional districts and 1988, 2008 and 2012 presidential candidate. In November 2010, Joshua Green of The Atlantic described Paul as the tea party's "intellectual godfather".
 Ken Paxton, Republican Texas Attorney General (2015–present), state senator (2013–2015), and state representative (2003–2013).
 Ted Poe, Republican U.S. representative  from Texas's 2nd congressional district (2005–2019) and a member of the Tea Party Caucus.
 Pete Sessions, Republican U.S. representative  from Texas's 5th (1997–2003) and 32nd (2003–2019) congressional districts, chair of the National Republican Congressional Committee and a member of the Tea Party Caucus.
 Lamar Smith, Republican U.S. representative  from Texas's 21st congressional district (1987–2019) and a member of the Tea Party Caucus.

Utah
 Rob Bishop, Republican U.S. representative  from Utah's 1st congressional district (2003–2021) and a member of the Tea Party Caucus. Bishop has appeared at Tea Party rallies in Utah.
 Mike Lee, Republican U.S. Senator (2011–present) and a member of the Tea Party Caucus.

Virginia
 Ken Cuccinelli, Republican Attorney General of Virginia (2010–2014) and nominee for Governor of Virginia (2013).

Washington
 Jaime Herrera Beutler, representative of Washington’s 3rd congressional district

West Virginia
 David McKinley, Republican U.S. representative  from West Virginia's 1st congressional district (2011–present) and a member of the Tea Party Caucus.

Wisconsin
 Ron Johnson, Republican U.S. Senator from Wisconsin (2011–present). Johnson has said he "did kind of spring out of the Tea Party" and is happy to be associated with the movement.

Wyoming
 Cynthia Lummis, Republican U.S. representative  from Wyoming's At-large congressional district (2009–2017), U.S. Senator (2021–present), and a founding member of the Tea Party Caucus.

References

Tea Party movement
Lists of 21st-century people
Conservatism-related lists
Libertarianism in the United States
Tea Party movement